Bhola Prasad Singh College is a degree college in Bhore, Gopalganj, Bihar, India. It is a constituent unit of Jai Prakash University. The college offers intermediate and three years degree course (TDC) in arts and science.

History 
The college was established in the year 1969.

Departments 

 Arts
 Hindi
  English
 Economics
 Political Science
 History
 Geography
 Science
 Mathematics
 Physics
 Chemistry
 Zoology
 Botany

References

External links 

 Jai Prakash University website

Colleges in India
Constituent colleges of Jai Prakash University
Educational institutions established in 1969
1969 establishments in Bihar